Tero Penttilä (born 9 March 1975) is a former professional football player who played for Rangers in defence.

Club career
Penttilä began football career at Reipas Lahti, before moving to arch rivals FC Kuusysi in 1994. By 1997, the two sides had merged and become FC Lahti. Penttilä continued to play for the side until 1999, when he moved to Haka Valkeakoski, where he won his first Veikkausliiga title. It was at Haka that the then Rangers manager Dick Advocaat noticed him during a UEFA Champions League qualifier. Penttilä joined the Gers in November 1999, he cost £300,000.

He made a total of five top team appearances (four in the league) over three seasons and left Rangers on 16 May 2002. He made 4 of his 5 appearances in the 1999/2000 season, but didn't make his 5th and final appearance until the 2001/02 season when he came on as a substitute against Kilmarnock. He returned to Veikkausliiga, with HJK Helsinki a month later. Penttilä was named team captain and won 2002 & 2003 league titles with the club. He retired in 2005 due to a knee injury and went on to study medicine.

International career
Penttila won five caps for Finland.

References

External links

1975 births
Living people
People from Suomussalmi
Sportspeople from Oulu
Finnish footballers
Finland international footballers
Association football defenders
FC Haka players
Rangers F.C. players
Scottish Premier League players
Finnish expatriate footballers
Expatriate footballers in Scotland